Patriarch George may refer to:

George I, Greek Orthodox Patriarch of Alexandria (r. 621–631)
George I, Greek Orthodox Patriarch of Antioch (r. 640-656)
George I, Ecumenical Patriarch of Constantinople (r. 679–686)
George I, Syriac Orthodox Patriarch of Antioch (r. 758–790)
George I, Greek Orthodox Patriarch of Jerusalem (r. 797–807)
George II, Greek Orthodox Patriarch of Antioch (r. 690–695)
George II, Greek Orthodox Patriarch of Alexandria (r. 1021–1051)
George II, Ecumenical Patriarch of Constantinople (r. 1191–1198)
George II Beseb'ely, Maronite Patriarch of Antioch (r. 1657–1670)
George III of Antioch, Greek Orthodox Patriarch of Antioch (r. 902–917)
Ignatius George II, Syriac Orthodox Patriarch of Antioch (r. 1687–1708)
Ignatius George III, Syriac Orthodox Patriarch of Antioch (r. 1745–1768)
Ignatius George IV, Syriac Orthodox Patriarch of Antioch (r. 1768–1781)
Ignatius George V, Syriac Orthodox Patriarch of Antioch (r. 1819–1837)
Ignatius George V Shelhot, Syriac Catholic Patriarch of Antioch (r. 1874–1891)